The Duke of York Handicap was a flat handicap horse race in Great Britain. It was run at Kempton Park, usually over a distance of 1¼ miles (2,012 metres).

History
Established in 1892, the event was originally called the Duke of York Stakes. It was named after Prince George, Duke of York (later King George V). The original version took place in October, and was open to horses aged three or older.

The Duke of York Stakes was initially contested over one mile. It was extended by three furlongs in 1899, and shortened by a furlong in 1900.

For a period York staged a different Duke of York Stakes at the Ebor meeting in August. A middle-distance race for three-year-olds, it was won by Polymelus in 1905. The same horse won Kempton's version the following year.

The Kempton race was abandoned during World War I. It was renamed the Duke of York Handicap in 1921.

A new event titled the Duke of York Handicap Stakes was introduced at York's May meeting in 1950. The original Kempton version was not regularly contested after World War II, but it was revived with a modified format in 1952. From this point it was restricted to three-year-olds and held in May.

Kempton's Duke of York Handicap continued to be run until 1960. It was replaced by a similar event, the H. S. Persse Memorial Handicap, in 1961. The York race, a six-furlong sprint, was replaced by the current Duke of York Stakes in 1968.

Winners
 1892: Miss Dollar
 1893: Avington
 1894: St Florian
 1895: Missal
 1896: Chin Chin
 1897: Diakka
 1898: Sirenia
 1899: Ercildoune
 1900: Mount Prospect
 1901: Revenue
 1902: Dundonald
 1903: Sceptre
 1904: Robert le Diable
 1905: Donnetta
 1906: Polymelus
 1907: Tirara
 1908: Simonson
 1909: Buckwheat

 1910: Wolfe Land
 1911: Trepida
 1912: Adam Bede
 1913: Florist
 1914: Nassau
 1915–18: no race
 1919: Grand Fleet
 1920: Orpheus
 1921: Paragon
 1922: Soubriquet
 1923: Poisoned Arrow
 1924: Pharos
 1925: Pharos
 1926: Winalot
 1927: Abbot's Speed
 1928: Rob
 1929: Double Life
 1930: Hot Bun

 1931: Pricket
 1932: China King
 1933: Limelight
 1934: Statesman
 1935: British Quota
 1936: Montrose
 1937: Noble Turk
 1938: Rodeo
 1947: Sea Lover
 1952: Judicate
 1953: Noorani
 1954: Blue Prince
 1955: Roman Festival
 1956: Talgo
 1957: Hesiod
 1958: Illinois
 1959: Honest Boy
 1960: Knight of the Dales

See also
 Horseracing in Great Britain
 List of British flat horse races

References

 galopp-sieger.de – Duke of York Stakes.
 pedigreequery.com – Duke of York Stakes.

Open middle distance horse races
Discontinued horse races
Kempton Park Racecourse
Flat races in Great Britain
1892 establishments in England
Recurring sporting events established in 1892
Recurring sporting events disestablished in 1960
1960 disestablishments in England